Svet may refer to:
 SVET plant growth system, a space greenhouse on the Kristall module of the space station Mir
 Mateja Svet (born 1968), former Slovenian alpine skier
 Peter Svet (born 1949), Slovenian runner
Scanning Vibrating Electrode Technique, a scanning probe microscopy technique visualizing local electrochemical processes

See also
 
 Shvets, a surname (including a list of people with the name)
 Svetly (disambiguation)